The Society Hill Historic District was added to the National Register of Historic Places in 1992 for its architectural significance.

Description
Most houses in the district were constructed between 1870 and 1910. The Chicago, Milwaukee and St. Paul train station was located near-by. Houses within the district include the homes of Zona Gale and Frederick Jackson Turner.

References

Houses on the National Register of Historic Places in Wisconsin
Houses in Columbia County, Wisconsin
Historic districts on the National Register of Historic Places in Wisconsin
National Register of Historic Places in Columbia County, Wisconsin